The genus Aptenodytes contains two extant species of penguins collectively known as "the great penguins".

Etymology 
The name "Aptenodytes" is a composite of Ancient Greek elements, "ἀ-πτηνο-δύτης" (without-wings-diver).

Taxonomy

 King penguin, Aptenodytes patagonicus
Aptenodytes patagonicus patagonicus
Aptenodytes patagonicus halli
 Emperor penguin, Aptenodytes forsteri
Ridgen's penguin (Aptenodytes ridgeni) is an extinct species known from fossil bones of Early or Late Pliocene age.

Combined morphological and molecular data have shown the genus Aptenodytes to be basal to all other living penguins, that is, the genus split off from a branch which led to all other species. DNA evidence suggests this split occurred around 40 million years ago. This had been foreshadowed by an attempt to classify penguins by their behavior, which also predicted the genus' basal nature.

Species
Two monotypic species are extant:

References

External links

 
Bird genera
Penguins
Extant Pliocene first appearances
Taxa named by John Frederick Miller